Let Freedom Reign is the third studio album by American R&B recording artist Chrisette Michele, released November 30, 2010 on Def Jam Recordings. Production for the album took place at several recording studios and was handled entirely by record producer Chuck Harmony, who also co-wrote most of the album with Michele.

The album debuted at number 25 on the US Billboard 200 chart, selling 42,000 copies in its first week. Upon its release, Let Freedom Reign received positive reviews from most music critics, who complimented its production and Michele's singing.

Background 
Recording sessions for the album took place at various recording locations, including KMA Studios and The Cutting Room in New York, New York, Vanilla Sky Studios in North Hollywood, California, and Westlake Recording Studios in Los Angeles, California. The album was produced entirely by Chuck Harmony.

Reception

Commercial performance 
The album debuted at number 25 on the US Billboard 200 chart, with first-week sales of 42,000 copies in the United States. It also entered at seven on Billboards R&B/Hip-Hop Albums and at number 12 on its Digital Albums chart.

Critical response 

Let Freedom Reign received positive reviews from most music critics. Allmusic writer Andy Kellman gave it four out of five stars and complimented its "upbeat disposition", calling it "the most energetic of Chrisette’s three albums". Entertainment Weeklys Simon Vozick-Levinson noted Michele's "assured performances" and commended her "timelessly sleek voice" and the album's "crisp, understated backdrops". Elysa Gardner of USA Today gave the album three out of four stars and complimented her "tangy singing, a distinctly feminine mix of silvery sensuality and catch-in-the-throat yearning".

Despite writing favorably of its arrangements and Michele's vocals, New York Daily News writer Jim Farber found the album's subject matter clichéd and wrote that it "seems torn between mainstream R&B and something more profound". The Philadelphia Inquirers A.D. Amorosi viewed that it "is not as focused as her previous albums", but complimented Michele's "elegant voice" and commented that "little in her catalog stands out as gorgeously as the ferocious ballad 'Goodbye Game'". Nate Chinen of The New York Times responded negatively to Michele's rapping on the album's title track, calling her verses "artless and stiff". However, Chinen commented more favorably of its other songs and wrote that "Michele is at her best redressing infringements more personal than political in nature".

Track listing 
 All tracks were produced by Chuck Harmony.

Personnel 
Credits for Let Freedom Reign adapted from Allmusic.

 Alejandro Barajas – assistant 
 Jesse Bond – bass, guitar 
 Jesse Bonds – guitar 
 Leesa D. Brunson – A&R 
 Chrisette Michele – executive producer, liner notes 
 Stephen Ferrera – A&R 
 Moses Gallart – assistant 
 Tom Gardner – assistant 
 Trevor Gates – assistant 
 Chuck Harmony – engineer, executive producer, instrumentation, organ, producer 
 Mike "TrakGuru" Johnson – engineer, production coordination 
 Doug Joswick – package production 

 Lance Tolbert – bass 
 John Legend – piano 
 Giovanna Morga – cello 
 Stanley Phillip – assistant 
 Herb Powers Jr. – mastering 
 Antonio "L.A." Reid – executive producer 
 Jazmine Sullivan – background vocals
 Mark Tavern – A&R 
 Dapo Torimiro – bass 
 Miranda Penn Turin – photography 
 Kristen Yiengst – artwork, photo coordination 
 Andy Zulla – Mixing

Charts

Weekly charts

Year-end charts

References 

2010 albums
Def Jam Recordings albums
Chrisette Michele albums